Bagra (also, Bāgra) is a village in Dhaka Division, Bangladesh.

References

Populated places in Dhaka Division